El Sharkia Sporting Club, is an Egyptian sports club based in Zagazig, El Sharkia, Egypt. The club was founded on 12 January 1961, and is best known for its hockey and football departments.

Football club
El Sharkia participated in the Egyptian Premier League for six times in its history, the first time was in 1973 win they won the 1972–73 Egyptian Second Division title, but the season has canceled after Tersana match, because of Yom Kippur War, the next season 74, the club was able to avoid relegation in its first season in the top flight but failed to stay in the league for more than two consecutive seasons and was relegated 1976.

In 1998, the club won the 1997–98 Egyptian Second Division title and promoted to the Premier League again, like in 1974 they avoided relegation in their first season, and relegated again in 2000.

In 2016, the club won the Egyptian Second Division Promotion play-off match against Tersana on penalties to win their third Egyptian Second Division title and to promote to the Premier League for six time.

Team kits
{| align=center style="background-color:transparent"
|+El Sharkia Kits
|-
|

Current squad

Egyptian Football Association (EFA) rules are that a team may only have 3 foreign born players in the squad.

(captain)

(vice-captain)

Hockey team
El Sharkia Club continues its hockey achievements by entering the Guinness Book of Records as the club won the African Championship Hockey League, its 26th edition, making the 23rd African win in history, 12 consecutive African titles, a sports record in the Encyclopaedia of World Sport.

Sharkia Club won the title following a win against the Egyptian Police Club (former winner of the title), with 1 goal to 0 in Bulawayo, Zimbabwe, in the presence of an estimated 5,000 to 20,000 fans who filled the stadium.

Four Egyptian teams took part in the 26th edition of the African Cup of Club Champions hockey (men and women) in Zimbabwe: Sharkia team (men and women), Police Sports Association team (men), and Shams team (women).

Sharkia team played six games before the final round, in which the team won five, and tied in one. In the first game, the team won against Hamilton, Zimbabwe's champion, in the second against Malawi's champion, Genetrix, in the third against Hypo, Zimbabwe's champion, in the fourth the team had a tie with the Police team, in the fifth the team won against Police Machines, champion of Nigeria, and in the sixth against Trastis, Ghana's team.

Meanwhile, the women's team won the Kenya Women hockey title after winning against the host team in Zimbabwe by 7 goals to 0, maintaining the title, which it won last year in Ugandan capital Kampala.

Sharkia team followed its African dream in 1988 by winning the first African Clubs Championship which was hosted in Egypt in Police Sports Association Club. The team carried on with the African winnings in consecutive championships, year after year, with a total of 23 out of 26 African championships, as well as 19 wins in the local league and six Egyptian cups. The team made it to the Guinness Book of Records and became the first African team to be in the records and have a distinct place globally.

Fans and Ultras group
Sharkia is considered one of the popular teams in Egypt and the most popular in El Sharkia

An Ultras group was formed on 2012 for Sharkia fans and was called Ultras Green Pirates or simply (UGP).

Honours
 Egyptian Second Division
 Winners (3): 1972–73, 1997–98, 2015–16

See also
 El Sharkia (field hockey)

References

Football clubs in Egypt
Association football clubs established in 1961
Egyptian field hockey clubs
Zagazig
1961 establishments in Egypt
Sports clubs in Egypt